Kelenföld railway station (Hungarian: Kelenföldi vasútállomás or incorrectly Kelenföldi pályaudvar, and until 2007 officially Budapest-Kelenföld) is Budapest's fourth busiest railway station (after Keleti pu, Déli pu and Nyugati pu). Opened in 1861, it is situated south-west of the city centre, in Újbuda or District XI in the suburb Kelenföld.

Today, Kelenföld is an extremely busy station, with almost all passenger and freight services operated by Hungarian Railways towards Transdanubia passing through.

The station is served by Kelenföld vasútállomás metro station and is the terminus of the Line 4 of the Budapest Metro which opened on 28 March 2014.

Next to the station there is a suburban Volánbusz bus terminal.

Train services
The station is served by the following services:

Railjet services
Budapest - Tatabánya- Győr - Vienna - St Pölten - Linz - Salzburg Hbf
Budapest - Tatabánya - Győr - Vienna - St Pölten - Linz - Salzburg - München Hbf
Budapest - Tatabánya - Győr - Vienna - St Pölten - Linz - Salzburg - Innsbruck - Zürich Hb
EuroCity services – EC
(Lehár) Budapest - Tatabánya - Győr - Wien Westbf
(Hortobágy) Nyíregyháza - Debrecen - Szolnok - Budapest - Tatabánya - Győr - Wien Westbf
(Avala) Belgrade - Novi Sad - Subotica - Kiskunhalas - Budapest - Tatabánya - Győr - Wien Westbf
Since the completion of "Wien Hauptbahnhof" (Wien Hbf) all trains to and from Budapest go via Wien Hbf. 
(Citadella) Budapest - Székesfehérvár - Veszprém - Zalaegerszeg - Celje - Ljubljana
EuroNight services – EN
(Kálmán Imre) Budapest - Tatabánya - Győr - Vienna - St Pölten - Linz - Salzburg - München Hbf
Int. InterCity services – IC
(Rába) Budapest Tatabánya - Győr - Szombathely - Graz Hbf
(Agram, Rippl-Rónai) Budapest - Dombóvár - Kaposvár - Koprivnica - Zagreb Glavni Kol.
Int. Express services
(Dacia) Wien Westbf - Győr - Tatabánya - Budapest - Szolnok - Békéscsaba - Arad - Deva - Brasov - București Nord

Inland
Intercity services – IC
(Borostyánkő-Tűztorony, Claudius-Volt Fesztivál, Savaris-Scarbantia, Alpokalja-Kékfrankos, Répce-Sopron Bank)Bp-Keleti pu. - Kelenföld - Tatabánya - Győr - Csorna / Répcelak - Szombathely / Sopron
(Baranya, Dráva, Mecsek, PTE, Sopianae, Tenkes, Tettye, Tubes, Zengő)Bp-Keleti pu. - Kelenföld - Sárbogárd - Pincehely - Dombóvár - Sásd - Szentlőric - Pécs

Public Transport
Kelenföld railway station is located in the 11th district of Budapest, Hungary.

 Metro:  
 Tram:  1, 19, 49
 Bus:  8E, 40, 40B, 40E, 53, 58, 87, 88, 88A, 88B, 101B, 101E, 103, 108E, 141, 150, 153, 154, 172, 173, 187, 188, 188E, 250, 250B, 251, 251A, 272
 Regional bus:  689, 691, 710, 712, 715, 720, 722, 724, 725, 727, 731, 732, 734, 735, 736, 760, 762, 763, 767, 770, 774, 775, 777, 778, 798, 799
 Nocturnal lines:  901, 907, 918

See also
 Kelenföld vasútállomás (Budapest Metro)

References

Railway stations in Budapest
1861 establishments in the Austrian Empire